Anastassia is a feminine given name. Notable people with this given name include the following

Anastassia Kovalenko (born 1991), Estonian motorcycle road racer
Anastassia Khozissova (born 1979), Russian model
Anastassia Michaeli (born 1975), Israeli journalist, television presenter, and politician
Anastassia Morkovkina (born 1981), Estonian footballer

See also

Anastasia
Anastasiia
Anastassiya
Anastassya Kudinova

Feminine given names